Saint-François-Xavier is a station on line 13 of the Paris Métro in the 7th arrondissement. It is named after the nearby Église Saint-François-Xavier, a church dedicated to Saint Francis Xavier (1506–1562), co-founder of the Society of Jesus.

History 
The station opened on 20 December 1923 as part of the original section of line 10 between Invalides and Croix Rouge (a ghost station east of Sèvres - Babylone; it was closed permanently during World War II). On 27 July 1937, as part of a reconfiguration of lines 8, 10, and the old line 14, the section of line 10 between Invalides and Duroc was transferred to become the first section of old line 14, linking Invalides and Porte de Vanves. On 9 November 1976, the old line 14 was merged with line 13 when it was extended from its former southern terminus at Saint-Lazare.

The station's corridors and lighting were renovated as part of the "Renouveau du métro" programme by the RATP on during the 2000s. In 2012, platform screen doors were installed on the platforms, together with eleven other stations on the line in an attempt to increase the average speed of trains and reduce track-related incidents due to the line's heavy traffic.

In 2019, the station was used by 1,701,996 passengers, making it the 266th busiest of the Métro network out of 302 stations.

In 2020, the station was used by 812,792 passengers amidst the COVID-19 pandemic, making it the 265th busiest of the Métro network out of 305 stations.

In 2021, the station was used by 1,213,378 passengers, making it the 260th busiest of the Métro network out of 305 stations.

Passenger services

Access 
The station has a single access at Place André-Tardieu. It was designed by Joseph Marie Cassien-Bernard in a neo-classical style and his name is engraved on it. It is installed with two Dervaux lampposts, a rare occurrence on the network where most accesses only have a single one installed, a feature it shares with Mairie des Lilas on line 11.

Station layout

Platforms 
The station has a standard configuration with 2 tracks surrounded by 2 side platforms.

Other connections 
The station is also served by lines 82, 86, and 92 of the RATP bus network.

Nearby 

 Église Saint-François-Xavier
 Headquaters of the Regional Council of Île-de-France
 La Pagode
 Lycée et collège Victor-Duruy
 Ministry of the Overseas
 Embassy of the Netherlands

Gallery

References

Roland, Gérard (2003). Stations de métro. D’Abbesses à Wagram. Éditions Bonneton.

Paris Métro stations in the 7th arrondissement of Paris
Railway stations in France opened in 1923

Paris Métro line 13